The Lunch is a very early painting by Spanish artist Diego Velázquez, finished c. 1617. The work, an oil painting on canvas, is in the Hermitage Museum of Saint Petersburg.

The painting portrays a table covered by a creased cloth, on which lie two pomegranates and a piece of bread. People attending the lunch include an aged man on the left and a young man on the right, while, in the background, an apparently carefree boy pours wine into a  jug. The smiling man on the right appears to be making the thumb signal. 

On the wall in the background hang a white neck-band, a leather bag and, on the right, a sword.

The Lunch is nearly identical to another painting by Velázquez, The Farmers' Lunch (1618).

The painting was on public display as 'The Breakfast' from February 2 to August 25, 2019 at the Amsterdam Hermitage in Amsterdam, the Netherlands, as part of the 'De Schatkamer!' exhibition.

References

Seville-period paintings by Diego Velázquez
1617 paintings
Paintings by Diego Velázquez in the Hermitage Museum
Paintings by Diego Velázquez
Food and drink paintings
Genre paintings